Zanonia is a genus of tropical creeper.

Zanonia may also refer to:
Zanonia indica, the sole member of the Zanonia genus.
Zanonia macrocarpa, obsolete classification of the Alsomitra macrocarpa tropical creeper having wing-shaped seeds
Zanonia, a genus of wasps in the family Pteromalidae; synonym of Colotrechnus

Ross RS-1 Zanonia sailplane.